Holy Mount, is a prominent peak in the Taconic Mountains of western Massachusetts, formerly used as the location of religious ceremonies by a nearby Shaker community.

Geography  
The mountain is located in Pittsfield State Forest and is traversed by the  loop Shaker Trail which begins at the historic Hancock Shaker Village. The mountain is wooded with northern hardwood tree species. In addition to the main summit, the mountain has two other peaks, a western spur called Mount Lebanon  and an unnamed northern peak .

Most of Holy Mount is located within Hancock, Massachusetts, but the lower western slopes are within the town of New Lebanon, New York. The Taconic ridgeline continues north from Holy Mount as Doll Mountain, south as an unnamed mountain, and to the east as Shaker Mountain. It is bordered by The Knob to the west across the Wyomanock Creek valley. The west side of the mountain drains into Wyomanock Creek, then into Kinderhook Creek, thence into the Hudson River and Long Island Sound. The east side drains into Shaker Brook, thence to the Housatonic River and Long Island Sound. Twin Ponds and Cranberry Pond, two highland water bodies, located on the southwest shoulder of the mountain and are visited by the Taconic Skyline Trail and Taconic Crest Trail.

Citations

References
 Massachusetts Trail Guide (2004). Boston: Appalachian Mountain Club.
 Commonwealth Connections proposal PDF download. Retrieved March 2, 2008.
 AMC Massachusetts and Rhode Island Trail Guide (1989). Boston: Appalachian Mountain Club.
 "Greenways and Trails" Massachusetts DCR. Retrieved February 22, 2008.

External links
 Pittsfield State Forest map
 Pittsfield State Forest. Massachusetts DCR.

Mountains of Berkshire County, Massachusetts
Taconic Mountains
Mountains of Columbia County, New York
Protected areas of Columbia County, New York
Mountains of New York (state)